Milson is a civil parish in Shropshire, England.  It contains six listed buildings that are recorded in the National Heritage List for England.  Of these, one is at Grade II*, the middle of the three grades, and the others are at Grade II, the lowest grade.  The parish contains the village of Milson and the surrounding countryside.  The oldest listed building is the church.  The other listed buildings are farmhouses, a house and a cottage, all of which are timber framed, and all of which date from before the middle of the 17th century.
 

Key

Buildings

References

Citations

Sources

Lists of buildings and structures in Shropshire